The Cingulopsoidea is a superfamily of sea snails, marine gastropod molluscs  in the clade Littorinimorpha.

Families
The following three families have been recognized in the taxonomy of Bouchet & Rocroi (2005):
Family Cingulopsidae Fretter & Patil, 1958
Family Eatoniellidae Ponder, 1965
Family Rastodentidae Ponder, 1966
Synonyms
 Coriandriidae F. Nordsieck, 1972: synonym of Cingulopsidae Fretter & Patil, 1958
 Eatoninidae Golikov & Starobogatov, 1975: synonym of Cingulopsidae Fretter & Patil, 1958

This taxonomy is based on the study by V. Fretter and A. M. Patil, published in 1958.

References

External links
 Bouchet, P., Rocroi, J.-P. (2005). Classification and nomenclator of gastropod families. Malacologia. 47(1-2): 1-397. 

Littorinimorpha